Pen & Pixel Graphics, Inc., was a Houston, Texas-based graphic design firm that specializes in musical album covers, especially for gangsta rap artists in the Southern United States. For a long time, it was the house design firm for No Limit Records, Cash Money Records, and Suave House Records. The company was started in 1992 by brothers Aaron and Shawn Brauch. The Brauch brothers and their staff worked with over 8,000 clients and completed 19,180 album covers before the company closed its doors in 2003. The brothers cited peer-to-peer file sharing website Napster and the September 11 attacks as reasons for the close; artists were reluctant to fly to Houston to view artwork that listeners would be unlikely to see.

The album covers Pen & Pixel produced have been described as "gaudy" and "outrageous". Common themes included bullets, cars, drugs, fire, gems, money, women, and other examples of wealth and riches. Pen & Pixel would fulfill client requests for custom album covers, with sketches of the album cover being drawn based on the concepts requested. These sketches would then be scanned by a computer, which would generate a list of items needed for the cover, such as cars and diamonds. Photos would then be taken of these items from different angles, so the same item could be reused in the future. Pen & Pixel apparently refused to produce possibly political covers.

In 2020, Pen & Pixel came out of retirement to design the cover art for 21 Savage and Metro Boomin's Savage Mode II. The artwork is in their signature design, "heavily" inspired by those of Cash Money and No Limit and is a nod to the "bling rap" album covers of the 1990s.

References

External links 
 

Design companies of the United States
Companies based in Houston
Design companies established in 1992
American companies established in 1992